Snow Lake Airport  is located  east northeast of Snow Lake, Manitoba, Canada.

See also
Snow Lake Water Aerodrome

References

Registered aerodromes in Manitoba